Gerard Dowling (born 10 November 1964) is an Australian former cricketer. He played two first-class cricket matches for Victoria between 1991 and 1992.

See also
 List of Victoria first-class cricketers

References

External links
 

1964 births
Living people
Australian cricketers
Victoria cricketers
Cricketers from Melbourne